William Theodore Basford Jr. (August 28, 1930 – September 30, 2022) was an American politician in the state of Florida.

Basford was born in Jacksonville, Florida and was an attorney. He served in the United States Navy and then received his bachelor's and law degrees from University of Florida. He served on the Jacksonville City Council. He served in the Florida House of Representatives from 1963 to 1966, as a Democrat.

Basford died in Jacksonville on September 30, 2022, at the age of 92.

References

1930 births
2022 deaths
Florida lawyers
Democratic Party members of the Florida House of Representatives
Jacksonville, Florida City Council members
Military personnel from Florida
Politicians from Jacksonville, Florida
University of Florida alumni